North Fork is a census-designated place (CDP) in Navajo County, Arizona, United States, on the Fort Apache Indian Reservation. The population was 1,417 at the 2010 census.

Geography
North Fork is located at  (33.996514, −109.959281).

Demographics

As of the 2010 census, there were 1,417 people living in the CDP: 712 male and 705 female. 548 were 19 years old or younger, 289 were ages 20–34, 280 were between the ages of 35 and 49, 226 were between 50 and 64, and the remaining 74 were aged 65 and above. The median age was 27.2 years.

The racial makeup of the CDP was 93.6% American Indian, 5.3% White, 0.4% Asian, 0.1% Black or African American, 0.1% Other, and 0.6% two or more races. 2.1% of the population were Hispanic or Latino of any race.

There were 364 households in the CDP, 310 family households (85.2%) and 54 non-family households (14.8%), with an average household size of 3.89. Of the family households, 179 were married couples living together, while there were 34 single fathers and 97 single mothers; the non-family households included 45 adults living alone: 17 male and 28 female.

The CDP contained 396 housing units, of which 364 were occupied and 32 were vacant.

References

Census-designated places in Navajo County, Arizona
White Mountain Apache Tribe